The following is a list of battles won by Indigenous peoples of the Americas:

North America 
 Battle of Bloody Run
 Battle of Cieneguilla
 Battle of Devil's Hole
 Battle of Duck Lake
 Battle of Fish Creek
 Battle of Fort Buchanan
 Battle of Fort Pitt
 Massacre at Fort William Henry
 Battle of Frenchman's Butte
 Battle of Hembrillo Basin
 Battle of Jupiter Inlet
 Battle of the Little Bighorn
 Battle of Platte Bridge
 Battle of the Rosebud
 Battle of Sand Butte
 Battle of Turkey Springs
 Battle of Yellow House Canyon
 Capture of Fort Jefferson (Kentucky)
 Capture of Fort Sandusky
 Chichimeca War
 Chickasaw Campaign of 1736
 Chickasaw Campaign of 1739
 Chickasaw Wars
 Dade massacre
 Deerfield Massacre
 First Battle of Dragoon Springs
 First Battle of Pyramid Lake
 First Battle of the Stronghold
 Fetterman Fight
 Fort Mims Massacre
 Fourth Battle of Tucson
 Gallinas massacre
 Grattan massacre
 Great Raid of 1840
 Kidder fight
 La Noche Triste
 Oatman Massacre
 Pueblo Revolt
 Sacred Heart Massacre
 Sheteck Massacre
 Spirit Lake Massacre
 St. Clair's Defeat
 Swansea Massacre
 Tonkawa Massacre
 Battle of Fort Dearborn
 Battle of Wild Cat Creek
 Frog Lake Massacre

South America 

 Battle of Catirai
 Battle of Curalaba
 Battle of Marihueñu
 Battle of Ollantaytambo
 Battle of Río Bueno
 Battle of Tucapel

References 

Indigenous people of the Americas
indigenous peoples of the Americas, won
Native American-related lists